The 6th constituency of Gard is a French legislative constituency in the Gard département.

Deputies

Election Results

2022

 
 
 
 
 
 
 
|-
| colspan="8" bgcolor="#E9E9E9"|
|-

2017

2012

References

Gard
French legislative constituencies of Gard